Araripelepidotes is a genus of ginglymodian fish.

Habitat 

Araripelepidotes was  probably endemic to the Araripe Basin, and was commonly found in Santana formation, and rare in the Crato Formation, mostly in carbonate concretions, but uncommon in laminated limestones.

Taxonomic history 
The type species A. temnurus was formerly placed in the genus Lepidotes, until it was moved to the new genus in 1990.

Paleoecology 
Araripelepidotes was likely a toothless suction feeder, due to the development of its mobile maxilla and the presence of an interoperculum, and would have inhabited estuarine and freshwater environments. It is the only semionotidid known from the Araripe Basin, except for Lepidotes wenzae.

References 

Prehistoric ray-finned fish genera
Cretaceous Brazil
Fossils of Brazil
Crato Formation
Romualdo Formation
Fossil taxa described in 1841
Taxa named by Louis Agassiz
Semionotiformes